Apamea relicina is a species of cutworm or dart moth in the family Noctuidae. It is found in North America.

The MONA or Hodges number for Apamea relicina is 9380.

Subspecies
These two subspecies belong to the species Apamea relicina:
 Apamea relicina migrata (Smith, 1903)
 Apamea relicina relicina (Morrison, 1875)

References

Further reading

 
 
 

Apamea (moth)
Moths of North America
Moths described in 1875
Articles created by Qbugbot